The Olympian is the name of two fictional characters in DC Comics.

Publication history
The original Olympian first appeared in "The Super Friends" #9 (December 1977) and was part of a 3-issue story arc that introduced other international super heroes, and the Wonder Twins, to DC continuity. Later, a two-story arc appeared in "The Super Friends" issues #45 & #46 (June & July 1981) where Olympian once again teamed up with several international heroes and The Super Friends.

Olympian later appeared in DC Comics Presents #46 (June 1982) and was the first time that he and the other international heroes were working as a team, under the name The Global Guardians. He was created by Nelson Bridwell and Alex Saviuk.

The second Olympian first appeared in Wonder Woman (volume 3) #30 (May 2009) and was created by Gail Simone.

Fictional character biography

Aristides Demetrios

Aristides Demetrios is a Greek national who wears the mythical Golden Fleece, which grants him the strength of Hercules and various other powers connected to the heroes who comprised the Argonauts. He aids Wonder Woman in battling Colonel Conquest in Greece, where a bomb was supposed to be hidden. In one incident, he helps Superman stop a gathering of mystical artifacts designed to bring back the villain Thaumar Dhai. They encounter Echidne, an old adversary of the Olympian, a beautiful woman with a long, gigantic snake form instead of legs. Olympian would later join Superman and many fellow Guardians on Easter Island. They again battled Echidne and her fellow mystics. Dhai's mystical return is reversed and he is seemingly destroyed. The Greek hero later meets Fury of Infinity Inc.

While in possession of the Golden Fleece, Aristedes can use any of the skills, powers and natural abilities possessed by any of the fifty original Argonauts. These abilities include the power of Hercules, the precognitive abilities of Idmon, the telescopic and x-ray vision of Lynceus, the speed of Atalanta, wisdom of Admetus, the memory of Aethalides, ability to walk on water like Euphemus, the flight ability of Zetes & Calais, the shapeshifting ability of Periclymenus, and the invulnerability of Achilles.

Olympian is a founding member of the Global Guardians. As detailed in a flashback, Olympian protests when the original 'Ice', otherwise known as Icemaiden leaves the Global Guardians because of her feelings of inadequacy. When he learned that his fellow members of the Global Guardians were to be supported by the Bialyan dictator Queen Bee, Olympian joins up. An unwitting participant in a public relations ploy, the Olympian helps his teammates and Justice League Europe battle a giant, alien robot on the grounds of the League's embassy. This robot was sent by the Queen Bee herself, using technology stolen from a now-dead member of the alien Dominators. The Queen did not care if the robot ended up killing any of the Guardians. The Olympian and Godiva help save nearby confused well-wishers from being crushed when the robot, damaged, threatens to fall on them. After the Queen Bee dies, her successor diagnoses his condition as schizophrenia and arrests him. He later reunites with the other Global Guardians and remains a member since.

A romantic relationship with Dorcas Leigh (Godiva) his teammate in the Global Guardians is interrupted when an ancient villain named Fain Y'Onia attacks the duo in London. A brief battle with Fain Y'Onia leaves them both injured and Godiva apparently powerless. Other Guardians were apparently rendered powerless by the villain and Bushmaster was slain. The Olympian rallies with the able-bodied members of the Guardians and ambushes Fain in the Arizona desert. During the battle, Tuatara is badly injured and Thunderlord is slain. The Wild Huntsman and Fain Y'Onia vanish from this reality. The Olympian is the one who theorizes that the Huntsman's final purpose was to do exactly that and that both will return one day.

The Olympian is later seen as a member of the Ultramarine Corps. During his time with the group he falls under the mental control of Gorilla Grodd. The Olympian nearly kills Martian Manhunter and Aquaman. Grodd is defeated and most of the Corps travel to another universe. The Olympian later appears in Infinite Crisis #4. He is part of a group of mystically-aligned beings who make a failed attempt to gain the aid of the Spectre. He is briefly seen in #6, working with many other people, from the military to other heroes, including Owlwoman. They fight a holding battle to protect the city of Metropolis from the Secret Society of Supervillains. The Olympain returns in Wonder Girl #4 (February 2008) as the guardian of Cassandra Sandsmark and her mother Helena, a position appointed to him by Zeus. During this storyline it is revealed that he and Cassandra's mother, Helena Sandsmark, have romantic feelings for one another.

Achilles Warkiller

Zeus created him when he felt that the female Amazons had failed in their mission and a new race of all-male heroes would need to rise to carry out his plans. Named Achilles and charged as the new leader of the Gargareans, he was created from the heart of the Hawaiian god Kane Milohai. He eventually becomes an ally to the Amazon princess. At one point, he is crowned the King of Themyscira (replacing Hippolyta and for political reasons chose the Amazon Alkyone as his Queen). However, Alkyone plotted to kill Princess Diana (as part of her overall quest to return Hippolyta to the throne). Achilles and Diana worked together and overthrew Alkyone. Later, Diana introduced Achilles to a man named Patrick Cleese, whom he recognized as the reincarnation of his beloved Patroclus from ancient times. He eventually settles in Markovia and joins the Outsiders.

Sexuality
In the Wonder Woman stories, Achilles marries a female Amazon for purely political purposes. After the dissolution of their marriage, he is introduced to a man that he believes is the reincarnation of Patroclus, with whom he had a relationship during ancient times. Although not directly indicated on-panel, Gail Simone (creator of Achilles) revealed in an interview that the character Achilles is gay.

Powers and abilities
Aristides Demetrios wields the Golden Fleece which grants him the power of fifty Argonauts.

Zeus granted Achilles Warkiller superhuman strength, speed, stamina and durability; the ability to fly; and regenerative abilities. He also rides into battle on-top of Mysia, a mystical flying elephant with three eyes and two trunks.

Other versions
 Issue #16 of the Trinity maxi-series features the Olympian (Aristides Demetrios) in an altered, unstable reality. He is working with a recon team trying to penetrate a wall of energy surrounding Europe. He and the 'Bloodlines' hero Lionheart perish upon contact with the wall.
 In The Multiversity Guidebook #1 there is an Earth-35 version of Olympian. He is a superhero with sports-themed equipment and a member of the Super-Americans and is an homage to Fisherman of Awesome Comics, created by Alan Moore in his run on Supreme, himself a pastiche of Green Arrow.

In other media

Television
Olympian appears in the Powerless episode "Sinking Day", portrayed by Matthew Atkinson. He appears as Wayne Security's new accountant Alex.

Miscellaneous
 The Aristides Demetrios version of the Olympian appears in Super Friends tie-in comics.
 The Aristides Demetrios version of the Olympian appears in issue #7 of the Batman: The Brave and the Bold comics. He helps Batman in defeating Circe.

See also
 Captain Wonder
 Wonder Boy
 Wonder Man

References

External links
 DCU Guide: Olympian
 CosmicTeams: Global Guardians

Achilles
Articles about multiple fictional characters
Characters created by Gail Simone
Classical mythology in DC Comics
Comics characters introduced in 1982
Comics characters introduced in 2009
DC Comics American superheroes
DC Comics characters who can move at superhuman speeds
DC Comics characters with superhuman strength
DC Comics LGBT superheroes
DC Comics superheroes
DC Comics male superheroes
Fictional gay males
Fictional Greek people
Fictional kings
Wonder Woman characters